Wahasuchus is a genus of extinct mesoeucrocodylian of the Middle Campanian age found in the Quseir Formation, Egypt. The generic name derives from the Arabic word واحة (waha), which means "oasis" and souchos from the Greek in honor of crocodile-headed god of ancient Egypt. The specific egyptensis (Lat.) means from Egypt.

Fossils of skull and jaw fragments, dorsal vertebrae, and fragmentary appendicular remains have been recovered.

References

Late Cretaceous crocodylomorphs of Africa
Mesoeucrocodylians
Fossil taxa described in 2018
Prehistoric pseudosuchian genera